The 2009–10 Tennessee Lady Volunteers basketball team represented the University of Tennessee in the 2009–10 NCAA Division I basketball season. The Lady Volunteers, coached since 1974 by Pat Summitt, play their home games at Thompson-Boling Arena in Knoxville, Tennessee. The Lady Vols, regular-season and tournament champions of the Southeastern Conference, were a #1 seed in the 2010 NCAA tournament, losing in the semifinals of the Memphis Regional to Baylor.

Offseason
April 3:Lady Vol basketball redshirt freshman center Kelley Cain had undergone successful knee surgery at UT Hospital.
May 3: To celebrate Pat Summitt's 1,000th basketball victory, the University of Tennessee Athletic Department hosted "Pat Summitt's Day of 1,000 Stories" at the Tennessee Theatre in downtown Knoxville.
May 7: Tennessee Lady Vol basketball signee Taber Spani, a 6–1 guard from Lee's Summit, Mo., received an invitation to participate in the USA U19 National Team  trials.
July 7: Pat Summitt and C. Vivian Stringer will oppose each other in the fourth annual Maggie Dixon Classic. The women’s doubleheader will be played Dec. 13 at Madison Square Garden. The two Hall of Fame coaches teams will meet in regular season play for the seventh straight year. Baylor and freshman star Brittney Griner will face Boston College in the other contest. The two teams played once before at Madison Square Garden. Tennessee won 68–54 in 1999. Baylor will be making its first appearance at MSG.
August 21: The 2009–10 preseason candidates list for the Women’s Wooden Award was released and the list named 31 student athletes. Angie Bjorklund from Tennessee was one of the candidates.

Schedule

|-
!colspan=9| Exhibition

|-
!colspan=9| Non-conference regular season

|-
!colspan=9| SEC regular season

|-
!colspan=9| 2010 SEC Tournament

|-
!colspan=9| 2010 NCAA Tournament

Regular season
The Volunteers participated in the State Farm Tip Off Classic, which was held on November 15. Two days later, the Volunteers participated in the ESPN Classic.

Roster

SEC Tournament

Player stats

Postseason

NCAA basketball tournament

Awards and honors

Team players drafted into the WNBA

See also
UConn–Tennessee rivalry

References

Tennessee Lady Volunteers basketball seasons
Tennessee
Tennessee
Volunteers
Volunteers